"Good Ship Venus", also known as "Friggin' in the Riggin", is a bawdy drinking song devised to shock with ever increasingly lewd and debauched sexual descriptions of the eponymous ship's loose-moralled crew. The tune usually used (especially for the chorus) is "Go In and Out the Window".

Lyrics 
The opening verse is typically something along the lines of:

However, the lyrics exist in numerous variations. For example, the last line varies, being substituted with any of a large variety of phrases such as 'Our crest a rampant penis', 'With a mouth full of dead man's penis', or 'Sucking on a red-hot penis'.

The usual rhyming structure for this song is the limerick AABBA structure.

A few other verses:

The Captain's wife was Mabel

She was ready, willing and able

On the floor, behind the door

Or under the kitchen table.

The first mate's name was Carter

By gad he was a farter!

When the wind wouldn't blow

And the ship wouldn't go

They'd get Carter the farter to start her.

The second mate's name was Topper

By Christ he had a whopper!

Once around the deck

Twice around his neck

And up his ass for a stopper.

Origin 
It is possible that this song was inspired by an actual event, where a female convict (Charlotte Badger), sailing on the colonial brigantine Venus, persuaded members of the crew to commandeer the vessel, sailing from Port Dalrymple, Tasmania, (now part of George Town, Tasmania) in 1806.

Despite various reports, the ultimate fate of the Venus is unknown. This may have led to speculation by those left behind, with fantasies leading to the creation of this drinking song. One of the verses also refers to a 'Charlotte':

HMS Venus, RN 
Five ships of the Royal Navy have borne the name  between 1758 and 1972.  The most recent was a destroyer launched in 1943, which was converted into a fast frigate in 1951, and served during the 1950s and 60s, to the  surprise of those who assumed the name in the song to be apocryphal. (She was a sister ship of HMS Troubridge, whose name inspired the fictional "HMS Troutbridge" in the long-running BBC radio comedy The Navy Lark of the same period).

Recordings 

Notable recordings include the Oscar Brand 1952 version, and the British punk band Sex Pistols, which appears on their Great Rock 'n' Roll Swindle album, and appears as the finale track in the film of the same name. Released as part of a double-A side, it reached No. 3 in the UK singles chart in 1979 and was the band's biggest selling single.

When a ship was required in The Goon Show it was often named the "Good Ship Venus" or "HMS Venus", one of several references to dirty jokes the Goons managed to get past the 1950s BBC censors.

The American thrash metal band Anthrax covered the Sex Pistols' version, but with different lyrics. In 2006 Loudon Wainwright III recorded it on the compilation album Rogue's Gallery: Pirate Ballads, Sea Songs, and Chanteys. The American punk band Showcase Showdown also released a version of the song on a tribute to the Sex Pistols.

Serbian punk rock musician Toni Montano recorded a version of the song, with lyrics in the Serbian language, entitled "Frigidna je bila", relying on the Sex Pistols version.

In British director Ken Russell's 2005 "Hot Pants Trilogy", "The Goodship Venus" short was billed as a musical trip around Cape Horn with "as horny a crew of sex-crazed sailors who ever sailed the seven seas." The trilogy received its world premiere at the Oldenburg Festival, Germany in Sept 2005.

In popular culture 
The chorus from the Sex Pistols' version of the song was used in the opening titles of the Channel 4 situation comedy Captain Butler; minor variations to the words (in spoken form) were added, notably by the series' lead actor Craig Charles.  A Royal Navy ship Venus is the setting of the film Carry On Jack. Also, in the Television Series Man About the House, George Roper tries to teach his budgerigar 'Oscar' the song 'On Board the Good Ship Venus' in the episode 'One more for the pot' (Season 6, Episode2).

References

Further reading 
 Cray, Ed. The Erotic Muse: American Bawdy Songs (University of Illinois, 1992).
 Legman, Gershon. The Horn Book. (New York: University Press, 1964).
 Roud Folk Song Index 4836

Comedy songs
Drinking songs
Sea shanties
Sex Pistols songs
Songs about boats
Year of song unknown
Songwriter unknown